Aurotalis similis is a moth in the family Crambidae. It was described by Graziano Bassi in 1999. It is found in Lesotho, South Africa and Namibia.

References

Crambinae
Moths described in 1999
Moths of Africa